William Inge (4 July 1829 – 23 May 1903) was an English first-class cricketer and clergyman, who became the Provost of Worcester College, Oxford.

The son of Charles Inge, he was born in July 1829 at Kegworth, Leicestershire. He was educated at Shrewsbury School, matriculating at Worcester College, Oxford in 1849, graduating B.A. in 1853. While studying at Oxford, Inge made two appearances in first-class cricket for Oxford University in 1853, appearing against Cambridge University and the Marylebone Cricket Club. In the match against Cambridge, he took a five wicket haul. 

Inge was elected a Fellow of Worcester College in 1853, a position he held until his resignation in 1859. He took holy orders in the Church of England in 1857, with his first ecclesiastical posting being at Crayke, North Yorkshire as curate, a post he held until 1875. He took up the post of vicar at Alrewas, Staffordshire in 1875, which he held until 1881. Inge was the provost of Worcester College from 1881 until his death at Oxford in May 1903. He was married to Susanna Churton, daughter of Edward Churton, Archdeacon of Cleveland. Their son, William, would become the Dean of St Paul's Cathedral. Inge's brothers, Francis and John, both played first-class cricket, as did his nephew Will Inge.

References

External links

1829 births
1903 deaths
People from North West Leicestershire District
Cricketers from Leicestershire
People educated at Shrewsbury School
Alumni of Worcester College, Oxford
English cricketers
Oxford University cricketers
Fellows of Worcester College, Oxford
19th-century English Anglican priests
Provosts of Worcester College, Oxford
20th-century English Anglican priests